Grandes Éxitos is the first greatest hits album by Colombian singer and songwriter Shakira. It was released on 2 November 2002, by Sony Music International and Columbia Records, one year after her fifth studio album and English-language debut Laundry Service. It is composed of Spanish-language recordings from her third and fourth studio efforts Pies Descalzos (1995) and Dónde Están los Ladrones? (1998), the live album MTV Unplugged (2000), and translations of tracks from Laundry Service (2001). The album only featured Spanish-language tracks and featured no new recordings. It also did not include songs from her first two studio albums, Magia and Peligro.

Upon its release, Grandes Éxitos achieved moderate commercial success, it was certified double-platinum (by standards for Latin recordings) for shipments of 200,000 copies by the Recording Industry Association of America (RIAA).

Track listing

Personnel
 Shakira - Producer, vocals, guitar
 Emilio Estefan Jr. - Executive producer
 Tim Mitchell — Compilation producer
 Luis Fernando Ochoa — Producer, songwriter
 Lester Mendez — Producer
 Pablo Florez — Producer, songwriter
 Javier Garza — Producer
 Ted Jensen — Mastering
 Leila Cobo — Liner notes
 Omar Cruz — Photography
 Ignacio Gurruchaga — Photography
 Ian Cuttler — Package design

Charts

Year-end charts

Certifications and sales

Release history

References

2002 greatest hits albums
Shakira compilation albums
Shakira video albums
Spanish-language compilation albums
Albums produced by Emilio Estefan
Sony Discos compilation albums
Music video compilation albums